Justin O'Brien  (2 August 1917 – 25 January 1996) was an Australian artist. He won the inaugural Blake Prize in 1951.

Collections
O'Brien's works are held in the collections of the National Gallery of Australia, the Art Gallery of New South Wales, the National Gallery of Victoria, the Art Gallery of South Australia, the University of Sydney, and the University of Southern Queensland.

The Australian National Portrait Gallery holds a number of portraits of O'Brien.

O'Brien was made a Member of the Order of Australia (AM) in the 1992 Queen's Birthday Honours for service to art.

He is the subject of an Australian Broadcasting Corporation Compass program.

References 

1917 births
1996 deaths
20th-century Australian painters
20th-century Australian male artists
Australian portrait painters
Religious painters
Australian still life painters
Catholic painters
Blake Prize for Religious Art winners
Members of the Order of Australia
Australian male painters